Carley Ann McCord (July 24, 1989 – December 28, 2019) was an American sports reporter.

Early life 
McCord was born and raised in Baton Rouge, Louisiana. She attended St. Michael the Archangel High School and graduated from Northwestern State University and later Louisiana State University. She competed in the Miss Louisiana pageant from 2009 to 2013 placing first runner-up in 2012 and 2013.

Broadcasting career
McCord got her first broadcast job in Cleveland working as an in-house reporter for the Cleveland Browns and was later hired by CBS Radio Cleveland to be a morning show cast member on WQAL-FM. After returning to Louisiana, she worked as a freelance broadcaster for Cox Sports Television, ESPN3 and WDSU. She also worked as the digital media reporter for the Louisiana Sports Hall of Fame and also the in-game host for the New Orleans Pelicans and the New Orleans Saints.

Death
On December 28, 2019, McCord was one of five passengers killed, shortly after take-off, aboard a small plane that crashed in a field one mile from the Lafayette Regional Airport.  A lone survivor was listed in critical condition. McCord was traveling to cover the Peach Bowl for WDSU; her father-in-law, Steve Ensminger, happened to be the offensive coordinator and quarterbacks coach for the LSU Tigers football team playing in the game. She was 30 years old.

References

1989 births
2019 deaths
American sports journalists
American women journalists
Journalists from Louisiana
Louisiana State University alumni
Northwestern State University alumni
Sportspeople from Louisiana
Victims of aviation accidents or incidents in the United States
Women sports journalists
Writers from Baton Rouge, Louisiana
21st-century American journalists
21st-century American women writers